Andrea Masi (born 30 March 1981) is a retired Italian rugby union footballer. His usual position was in the centres but he has also played at fly-half and at full-back. His last club before retirement was the English Premiership club Wasps. In a 16-year international career lasting from 1999 to 2015, Masi won 95 caps for the Italy national team, and was a part of their squad at four World Cups in 2003, 2007, 2011 and 2015.

Masi was born in L'Aquila, Abruzzo. He was recognized as a talented player at an early age, and he made his debut for L'Aquila at the age of 16.
He was soon called up for national selection, and made his international debut for Italy against Spain in 1999. He became a regular in the Italian squad, but did not feature in the Six Nations until 2003 when he appeared against England.

He joined Viadana in 2003 and was also included in Italy's squad for the World Cup in Australia that year. He had his 2005 season disrupted by injury. In the 2008 Six Nations Championship, new coach Nick Mallett played Masi at fly-half, a role he had not played before but many experts believed this move was unsuccessful and he was moved to full-back for the start of the 2009 Six Nations Championship.

In March 2011, Masi was named the 2011 Six Nations Player of the Championship. Masi scored Italy's late try in their first ever Championship win against France.

In June 2011 he joined the Pro12 Italian franchise Aironi. However, the team was discontinued in 2012, and Masi moved to England to join Wasps. 

In 2016, Masi retired from playing and subsequently took up a position as a coach for the Wasps academy. In 2021, Masi left Wasps for a return to Italy in a coaching role for Benetton Rugby.

References

External links

1981 births
Living people
People from L'Aquila
Aironi players
Biarritz Olympique players
Racing 92 players
Italian rugby union players
Italy international rugby union players
Zebre Parma players
Wasps RFC players
Rugby union fullbacks
Italian expatriate rugby union players
Italian expatriate sportspeople in France
Italian expatriate sportspeople in England
Expatriate rugby union players in France
Expatriate rugby union players in England
Sportspeople from the Province of L'Aquila